KVMA (630 AM) is a radio station licensed to Magnolia, Arkansas. The station broadcasts a country music format and is owned by Noalmark Broadcasting Corporation.

References

External links
KVMA's website

VMA
Country radio stations in the United States
Noalmark Broadcasting Corporation radio stations
Magnolia, Arkansas